Wherever You Are Tonight is the fourth studio album released by American country music singer Keith Whitley. It was the second posthumous album of his career. The album consists of ten songwriter demos that Whitley had recorded. His vocal was the only track kept from those original demos. All new music arrangements were written by Ron Oates to renew and dynamically support Whitley's vocals. The album was released via BNA Records, the label to which Whitley's widow, Lorrie Morgan, was signed at the time. "Wherever You Are Tonight" peaked at #75 on the U.S. Billboard Hot Country Singles & Tracks (now Hot Country Songs) charts in 1995.  "Light at the End of the Tunnel" was originally recorded by John Anderson on his 1988 album, 10.

Track listing
"I'm Losing You All Over Again" (Keith Whitley, Bill Caswell) – 4:10
"Daddy Loved Trains" (Whitley, Don Cook) – 3:01
"Tell Me Something I Don't Know" (Whitley, Cook, Gary Nicholson) – 3:02
"Blind and Afraid of the Dark" (Whitley, Max D. Barnes) – 3:58
"Buck" (Whitley) – 3:01
"Light at the End of the Tunnel" (Whitley, Cook) – 3:08
"I'm Not That Easy to Forget" (Whitley, Cook, Curly Putman) – 2:54
"Just How Bad Do You Wanna Feel Good" (Whitley, Caswell) – 2:56
"Leave Well Enough Alone" (Whitley, Caswell) – 3:44
"Wherever You Are Tonight" (Whitley, Cook, Nicholson) – 3:19

Personnel
As listed in liner notes.

Musicians
Ron Oates – piano, synthesizers
Mike Chapman – bass guitar
Jerry Kroon – drums
Pete Bordonali – acoustic guitar, Dobro, mandolin
Brent Rowan – electric guitar
Sonny Garrish – pedal steel guitar, lap steel guitar, Dobro, Pedabro
Michael Douchette – harmonica
Bruce Watkins – fiddle, mandolin
Rob Hajacos – fiddle
Carl Gorodetzky – violin
Conni Ellisor – violin
Alan Umstead – violin
Lee Larrison – violin
Robert Mason – cello
John Catchings – cello
John Wesley Ryles – background vocals
Penny Cardin – background vocals
Tony King – background vocals
Dennis Wilson – background vocals
Keith Whitley – lead vocals

Rhythm section arrangements by Ron Oates.
Orchestra arranged and conducted by Ron Oates

References

1995 albums
BNA Records albums
Keith Whitley albums
Albums published posthumously